Roy Billinton (born September 14, 1935) is a Canadian scholar and a Distinguished Emeritus Professor at the University of Saskatchewan, Saskatoon, Saskatchewan, Canada. In 2008, Billinton won the IEEE Canada Electric Power Medal for his research and application of reliability concepts in electric power system. In 2007, Billinton was elected a Foreign Associate of the United States National Academy of Engineering for “contributions to teaching, research and application of reliability engineering in electric power generation, transmission, and distribution systems."

Billinton is known in academia and the power industry for his work on power system reliability evaluation. He is the author or co-author of eight books dealing with power system reliability. Two of these books, now in their second editions, have been republished in Chinese and one in Russian. His first book, published in 1970, is considered to be the first book in English on the subject of power system reliability.
These books have been used worldwide as research and study textbooks.  He is the author or co-author of over 950 technical papers related to his research with over 525 publications in international refereed journals. Over 400 papers were published in Conference Proceedings in Canada, the United States, the United Kingdom, France and other countries.

Billinton's other areas of significant contribution include the probabilistic evaluation of transient stability, overall system reliability incorporating a hierarchical system framework, common cause and dependent component outages, adverse weather outage models and the development of the Roy Billinton Test System (RBTS).

Billinton was a co-founder of the Probabilistic Methods Applied to Power Systems International Society in 1997 and has been on the board of the society as a director and the chair since its inception.

Academic career 

Billinton obtained B.Sc. and M.Sc. degrees from the University of Manitoba, Ph.D. and D.Sc. degrees from the University of Saskatchewan, and received the University of Saskatchewan Distinguished Researcher Award in October 1993. He joined the University of Saskatchewan as an assistant professor in 1964, after working in the System Planning and Production Divisions of Manitoba Hydro. He became a fellow of the Royal Society of Canada in 1980, and was selected a fellow of the Canadian Academy of Engineering in 1999.

In addition, Billinton served the College of Engineering as executive director of the University of Saskatchewan 'Canadian International Development Authority (CIDA)'/Inner Mongolia Engineering College Project and as the University of Saskatchewan member on the CIDA/Nepal Engineering College Consortium. He served as chair of the Consortium for several years. His contributions to international activities at the University of Saskatchewan were recognized by presenting him with the J.W. George Ivany Internationalization Award in 2000.

Billinton supervised over one hundred and thirty graduate students. Over forty of these students obtained Ph.D degrees. His teaching skills have been recognized by receiving the IEEE Outstanding Power Engineer Educator Award in 1992 and the IEEE Canada Outstanding Engineer Educator Award in 2001.  After holding a number of academic responsibilities at the University of Saskatchewan, including serving as an assistant professor, associate professor, professor, head of the Department of Electrical Engineering, assistant dean, associate dean, and acting dean. Billinton retired and became a professor emeritus effective July l, 2003.

Research areas 

Billinton's area of research is electric power system reliability, economics and performance. He co-founded the University of Saskatchewan Power System Research Group and developed a wide range of techniques to evaluate the reliability of engineering systems, from simple configurations to complex systems such as large electricity generation, electric power transmission and electric power distribution systems.   His research has applied and studied the well-being approach in the system operating domain, in generating capacity planning and in composite system reliability evaluation. These studies include the effects of variable wind power and are considered to be significant contributions to power system reliability research. Billinton has made a significant contribution to the development and application of quantitative techniques for past performance and predictive assessment of power system reliability.

Utilization of Markov models 
Billinton's work involves both repair and replacement activities. An important initial contribution by Billinton to the power engineering literature was the utilization of Markov models to incorporate component repair and spare component provisions. These models were applied to evaluate the benefits of spare transformers and mercury arc valves in high voltage direct current transmission converter stations, such as those being considered by Manitoba Hydro for their Nelson River development. This was an important practical application of Markov modeling. Markov models are now routinely used in many power system reliability applications.

Incorporation of variable resources 
One important area of research that arose from earlier studies at Manitoba Hydro was the recognition and need to quantitatively evaluate the operating risk associated with adding large generating units to a relatively small electric power utility.  This concern resulted in a major area of study on spinning or operating capacity reliability assessment that incorporated load forecast uncertainty, rapid start and hot reserve considerations, and the incorporation of interruptible loads. These studies were completed many years ago but are now being reconsidered and extended to incorporate renewable energy sources. The increasing penetration of wind power in modern electric power systems introduces new dimensions in risk evaluation in both the planning and operating domains. Considerable progress has been made in incorporating the inherent variability associated with wind power in both generating capacity adequacy and security evaluation.

Cost of customer interruptions 
One of the most visible areas of Billinton's research is that of reliability cost/worth evaluation involving customer power interruption costs. This research extends the calculation of conventional reliability indices to include customer damage in the form of increased monetary costs due to power supply failures. This is now known as value-based reliability assessment (VBRA), in which the unreliability costs are added to the capital and operating costs to produce the total cost value used in project decision making. The VBRA process involves having component reliability data, the ability to calculate suitable load point reliability indices and applicable customer damage costs. These three requirements are highly visible contributions in Billinton's list of journal and conference publications.

Impact on industry 
Billinton's research work and related industrial activities have provided considerable assistance in the development of models, methods and standards for component and system reliability assessment. His contributions to the IEEE Standard developments, the CEA Equipment Reliability Information System (ERIS) and Electric Power System Performance Assessment (EPSRA) systems and the research and development of reliability models were recognized by the IEEE by presenting Billinton with the Charles Proteus Steinmetz Award in 2008. Billinton has provided consulting services to all the major Canadian electric power utilities and many other organizations around the world. He has presented over 100 individual utility courses dealing with power system reliability evaluation.

IEEE involvement  
Billinton has been very active in the Institute of Electrical and Electronics Engineers (IEEE). He joined the IEEE Application of Probability Methods (APM) Subcommittee in 1964 and subsequently served a three-year term as its chairman. He has served on many Task Forces (TF) and Working Groups (WG) over the past fifty years. These include the Performance Records for Optimizing System Design (PROSD) WG, the T & D Component Outage Data TF, the Deterministic Transmission Criteria TF, the Bulk Power Indices TF (chair) and numerous others. He has been involved in the development and subsequent creation of three important standards in the area of power system reliability assessment.  He became a fellow of the IEEE in 1978.

The Roy Billinton Power System Reliability Award was initiated in 2010 by the IEEE Power & Energy Society to honor Billinton and “to recognize outstanding individuals for their contributions to reliability of electric power systems."

Canadian Electricity Association 
Billinton had considerable connection over a long period of time with the Canadian Electricity Association (CEA). He joined the CEA in 1962 while working for Manitoba Hydro. He served as CEA's Chair of the Power System Reliability Subsection, the System Planning and Operating Section and the Engineering and Operating Division. He is a founding member of the CEA Consultative Committee on Outage Statistics and served as its chair for over twenty-five years. Under his guidance, the CEA has developed and operates, what is considered the most comprehensive power system outage data collection system in the world.

The Equipment Reliability Information System (ERIS) collects and produces component outage data for generation and transmission systems. The Electric Power System Performance Assessment (EPSRA) protocols cover bulk system performance assessment, significant power interruptions and service continuity data. The ERIS and EPSRA methodologies developed for collecting data using a common set of definitions are now accepted as Canadian electric power industry standards. Both ERIS and EPSRA are national systems that have the strong support of Canada's electric power utilities. The models and techniques developed in Billinton's research program have provided considerable impetus to the development of suitable protocols for component and system outage data collection.

His contributions to the CEA and Canada were recognized by giving him the CEA Centennial Award for distinguished service to the Canadian electric power industry in 1991.

Honors 

 Foreign Associate, United States National Academy of Engineering, 2007
 Fellow, Canadian Academy of Engineering, 1999
 Fellow, Safety and Reliability Society (U.K.), 1988–2002
 Fellow, Engineering Institute of Canada, 1981
 Fellow, Royal Society of Canada, 1980
 Fellow, Institute of Electrical and Electronics Engineers, 1978
 Institute of Electrical and Electronics Engineers Initiated the Roy Billinton Power Reliability Award, 2010

Awards 

 IEEE Power & Energy Society, Prize Paper Award, 2014 
 IEEE Canada Electric Power Medal,2008
 IEEE Charles Proteus Steinmetz Award, 2008
 Saskatchewan Centennial Medal, 2005
 IEEE Third Millennium Medal, 2002
 IEEE Canada Outstanding Engineering Educator Award, 2001
 J.W. George Ivany Internationalization Award, October 2000
 IEEE McNaughton Gold Medal, September 1994.
 University of Saskatchewan Distinguished Researcher Award, October 1993
 IEEE Outstanding Power Engineering Educator Award July 1992
 First Recipient of the Canadian Electrical Association Distinguished Service Award - non utility category, Centennial Meeting, Toronto, May 1991
 Association of Professional Engineers of Saskatchewan Engineering Achievement Award, 1986
 Saskatoon Engineer of the Year, 1978
 Engineering Institute of Canada, Ross Medal, 1972
 Engineering Institute of Canada, Sir George Nelson Award, 1965, 1967
 University of Manitoba Gold Medal, 1960

Published works

Academic books (authored or coauthored)

Selected academic articles 

 (2012) 
 (2009) 
 (2009) 
 (2008) 
 (2007) 
 (2004) 
 (2001) 
 (1999) 
 (1996) 
 (1993) 
 (1991) 
 (1990) 
 (1989) 
 (1987) 
 (1986) 
 (1980) 
 (1978) 
 (1972) 
 (1969)  
 (1968)

References 

1935 births
Living people
Canadian electrical engineers
Fellows of the Royal Society of Canada
University of Manitoba alumni
University of Saskatchewan alumni
Foreign associates of the National Academy of Engineering